Veolia Water Southeast (formerly Folkestone & Dover Water Services) was a privately owned company supplying water in south east Kent, England. The company's chairman was Paul Sabin.

History
The history of the Company can be traced back to Folkestone's first piped water supply. Aside from the part of Kent which is closest to London, Folkestone was the first town in the county to have a public water supply operated under the powers of the Waterway Clauses Act 1847 – the Act which opened the way to create water undertakings throughout the land.

The company was renamed Veolia Water Southeast in July 2009 following plans by Veolia Water UK to use the brand across its businesses. Veolia Water UK is part of the Veolia Environnement group of companies. In 2012, following the sale of Veolia Water's UK water supply business, it was merged with Veolia Water Central and Veolia Water East to form Affinity Water on 1 October 2012.
Veolia Water Southeast was a water only company providing around 43 million litres of water a day to approximately 158,000 customers throughout Folkestone and Dover together with surrounding rural areas including Romney Marsh and Dungeness.

Operations
The area served was entirely reliant on water stored underground in chalk or gravel aquifers, as there was no surface water from rivers or major reservoirs to draw on.

The company head office was located close to the original reservoir site used by the company over 150 years ago.

Between 2009 and 2011, Veolia Water embarked on a programme of installing water meters, beginning with Folkestone and moving to other areas.

See also
United Kingdom water companies

References

External links
 Official Veolia Water Southeast website
 Veolia Water website

Veolia
Former water companies of England
Defunct companies based in Kent
British companies established in 1848
Food and drink companies established in 1848
Food and drink companies disestablished in 2012
1848 establishments in England
2012 disestablishments in England